The 9×39mm is a Soviet rifle cartridge.

History and design
The 9x39 is based on the Soviet 7.62×39mm case, but with the neck expanded to fit a .364" bullet. Final design was completed by N. Zabelin, L. Dvoryaninova and Y. Frolov of the TsNIITochMash in the 1980s. The intent was to create a more stealthy cartridge for suppressed firearms used by Spetnaz and other special troops that had more power, range and penetration than 7.62 US subsonic round used in AKM-type rifles at the time. 

The subsonic round as originally designed has an optimistic effective lethal range of 400 to 530 meters and a maximum penetration of up to 10 mm of steel. Like the 5.45×39mm cartridge, 9×39mm SP-5 features an airpocket in the tip, which increases its tendency to yaw or "keyhole" upon impact, thus increasing soft tissue damage in human targets. The armor-piercing SP-6 cartridge is more effective against light armor, vehicles, or light barrier targets.

Commercial Wolf and Tula brand Ammunition that was being imported into the United States was subsequently banned on September 7, 2021 by President Biden as part of sanctions against Russia for invading Ukraine. 

While the 9x39 is very popular in several European countries, many of which had previously been under the control of the USSR, it was only introduced in America in late 2018.  

Since there are many users in the U.S. that had adopted the 9x39 round prior to the import ban, were forced to reload their own ammunition. Thankfully, there are multiple companies worldwide who make(.366") 9.3mm Mauser bullets which are suited for reloading the 9x39 including Hornady, Barnes, Nosler, Prvi Partizan, Lapua, and others.  

Redding Reloading produces a set of full size reloading dies.

Lehigh Defense briefly made prototypes that had limited distribution of their maximum expansion and xtreme penetration copper bullets designs for subsonic rounds. 

KAK Industries sold bullets which include 125 gr solid copper, and 140 gr slitted copper projectiles capable of being fired at supersonic velocities. 

There are companies such as NOE and LEE which make cast bullet molds for the 9.3mm Mauser cartridge.  Powder coated cast bullets generally work exceptionally well at subsonic velocities and have decent expansion in gel targets too.

Variants

SP-5 (7N8) – The SP-5 (СП-5) (SP: Spetsialnyj Patron; "special cartridge") was developed by Nikolai Zabelin. It is a conventional lead core FMJ bullet, developed for accuracy.

SP-5UZ – The SP-5UZ (СП5-УЗ) is an SP-5 variant with an increased charge intended for a factory-specific strength testing of the weapons.

SP-6 (7N9) – The SP-6 (СП-6) was developed by Yuri Frolov. It has a hardened metal armor-piercing core. At 100 meters it can penetrate  of steel or GOST 3 rated body armor, while retaining enough power to inflict damage to a soft target behind it.

SP-6UCh – The SP-6Uch (СП-6Уч) is an SP-6 variant intended for training.

PAB-9 (7N12) – The SP-6's bullet is expensive to manufacture, so an attempt was made to make a lower-cost version of the cartridge. The PAB-9 (ПАБ-9) used a stamped rather than machined steel core. It sacrificed too much performance to be usable. As of 2011, its usage by Russian troops is prohibited.

SPP –  The SPP (СПП) (SPP: Snaiperskiy, Povishennaya Probivaemost; "sniper – increased penetration") is a sniper round with increased penetration.

BP – The BP (БП) (BP: Broneboinaya Pulya; "armor-piercing bullet") is an armor-piercing round. Three modernizations of PAB-9 were created under the designation of BP to remedy its unusable performance.

Weapons

 9A-91
 AK-9
 AS "Val"
 OTs-12 "Tiss"
 OTs-14-4A "Groza"
 SR-3, SR-3M "Vikhr"
 VSK-94
 VSS Vintorez
 AMB-17

See also
 12.7×55mm STs-130

References

Bibliography

External links
 photo of cartridges
 photo of cartridges
 photo of bullets
 Modern Firearms - Special purpose small arms ammunition of USSR and Russia
  9×39mm special cartridges

Pistol and rifle cartridges
Military cartridges
Subsonic rifle cartridges